Marlon Escalante (born February 19, 1974) is a Venezuelan football referee. He has been a FIFA international referee since 2009.

See also
Football in Venezuela

References

External links
Bio at worldreferee.com

1974 births
Living people
Venezuelan football referees
Place of birth missing (living people)
21st-century Venezuelan people